The Poisoners is a 1936 historical mystery novel by the British writer Marjorie Bowen, written under the pen name of George Preedy. It is based on the Affair of the Poisons, during the reign of Louis XIV in seventeenth-century France.

References

Bibliography
 Vinson, James. Twentieth-Century Romance and Gothic Writers. Macmillan, 1982.

1936 British novels
Novels set in France
British historical novels
British mystery novels
Novels set in the 17th century
Novels by Marjorie Bowen
Hutchinson (publisher) books
Affair of the Poisons